The large moth family Gelechiidae contains the following genera:

Dactylethrella
Daltopora
Darlia
Decatopseustis
Deltophora
Dendrophilia
Dentivalva
Deoclona
Deroxena
Desmaucha
Diastaltica
Dichomeris
Dicranucha
Diprotochaeta
Dirhinosia
Dissoptila
Distinxia
Dolerotricha
Dorycnopa
Drepanoterma
Dubitationis

References

 Natural History Museum Lepidoptera genus database

Gelechiidae
Gelechiid